Mr. Moonlight may refer to:

"Mr. Moonlight" (song), a 1962 song written by Roy Lee Johnson, notably covered by The Beatles
Mr. Moonlight (album), a 1994 album by Foreigner
"Mr. Moonlight (Ai no Big Band)", a 2001 song by Morning Musume